Edison Fernando Bravo Mansilla (born ) is a Chilean cyclist. He competed in the individual pursuit and scratch event at the 2012 UCI Track Cycling World Championships.

Major results
2010
 1st  road race, Pan American Junior Road Championships
 National Junior Road Championships
1st  time trial
2nd road race
2011
 1st Stages 5 & 6 
2012
 1st Stage 4 
 1st Stage 4 
2013
 1st Overall 
1st Stage 3
 3rd Overall 
 5th Overall Vuelta a la Comunidad de Madrid Sub 23
2016
 1st  road race, National Road Championships
2017
 3rd Overall Vuelta Ciclista a Chiloe

References

External links
 

1992 births
Living people
Chilean track cyclists
Chilean male cyclists
Place of birth missing (living people)
Cyclists at the 2010 Summer Youth Olympics
People from Puerto Montt
20th-century Chilean people
21st-century Chilean people